Cité Universitaire is a station on RER B of Île-de-France's express suburban rail system, the Réseau Express Régional. It is situated in the 14th arrondissement of Paris. The station serves the Cité Internationale Universitaire de Paris (CIUP) and replaced a line on the Ligne de Sceaux called Sceaux-Ceinture, after the fact that it was a junction with the now-inoperable Ligne de Petite Ceinture

Adjacent tram stop
 Cité Universitaire on Île-de-France tramway Line 3a

See also

List of stations of the Paris RER

Buildings and structures in the 14th arrondissement of Paris
Railway stations in France opened in 1846
Réseau Express Régional stations